Amitabha Bose is an American attorney and transportation policy advisor who is the administrator of the Federal Railroad Administration. Bose has served as deputy administrator since January 2021 and was confirmed by the senate on January 12, 2022. He is the first person of South Asian descent to lead the FRA.

Early life and education 
Bose arrived in the United States at age five and grew up in DeKalb County, Georgia. He received a Bachelor of Arts degree from Columbia University in 1994, a Master of International Affairs from the School of International and Public Affairs, Columbia University in 1995, and a Juris Doctor from the University of Georgia School of Law.

Career 
Bose served in the New Jersey Department of Transportation before holding posts in the United States Department of Transportation, where he was the associate general counsel and deputy assistant secretary for governmental affairs. He later joined the Federal Railroad Administration, where he served as deputy administrator and chief counsel during the Obama administration. During his tenure at the DOT and the FRA, he was involved in the Northeast Corridor Gateway Program, California High Speed Rail Project, Northeast Corridor Future, Southeast Passenger Rail and Build America Bureau.

After leaving the public sector, Bose joined HNTB in 2017 as mid-Atlantic district transit and rail director, and associate vice president. He also served as board chairman of the Coalition for Northeast Corridor.

On January 22, 2021, Bose was appointed to the role of deputy administrator of the Federal Railroad Administration. On January 12, 2022, Bose was confirmed by the Senate to be the administrator of the Federal Railroad Administration by a vote of 68–29.

References 

Living people

Year of birth missing (living people)
American politicians of Indian descent
Columbia College (New York) alumni
School of International and Public Affairs, Columbia University alumni
University of Georgia School of Law alumni
United States Department of Transportation officials
Biden administration personnel